Kailashnath Mahadev Statue is the second tallest Shiva statue in the world. It is currently the fifth tallest Hindu deity statue.It is situated in Sanga, Kavrepalanchok District in Nepal, about 20km from Kathmandu.

The statue is 143 feet (43.5m) in height and was made using copper, zinc, concrete, and steel.

Design and construction
Designed to resemble images of the Hindu god, Shiva, and seen as a marvel of Nepalese engineering, the statue's construction began in 2003 and was completed in 2011. It was constructed mainly by Kamal Jain and "Hilltake", a company established in Nepal in 1992 which deals with products such as water tanks. Nepalese engineers were involved in the design and construction of large structures.

The statue's foundation is about 100 feet deep, which was necessary to anchor the structure into the ridge. Due to the threat of potential landslides, structures were also built for ground stabilization.

Tourism 
About 5,000 visitors come to the statue on a weekday, and a significantly larger number visit on weekends, national holidays, and Hindu festivals.

Due to the number of visitors the statue has contributed to religious tourism in Nepal, both locally and internationally, raised the economic activity of the local community, and has made an impact on the development of nearby villages.

References 

Shiva temples in Nepal
Nepalese culture
Hindu temples in Kathmandu District
Colossal statues
Tourist attractions in Nepal
Forms of Shiva
Sculptures of gods
Shiva in art
Buildings and structures in Bhaktapur District
2010 establishments in Nepal
[[Category:Sanga-Major attraction near Kathmandu]]